Trusteeship is  a legal term which, in its broadest sense, is a synonym for anyone in a position of trust.

Trusteeship may also refer to:

Trust law, a three-party fiduciary relationship
Trusteeship (Gandhism), a socio-economic philosophy
United Nations Trusteeship, Chapter XII of the United Nations Charter
United Nations Trusteeship Council, one of the six principal organs of the United Nations

See also 
Trustee (disambiguation)